The term dysphrenia was coined by the German medical specialist Karl Kahlbaum to designate a clinical picture in 19th-century psychiatry. Today the concept is still used in the western world as a lay generic synonym for mental disorder in adults, and as a term to describe different cognitive/verbal/behavioral deficits in children and adolescents. It is also used in the People's Republic of China, controversially, to identify a local medical diagnostic category. A number of followers of Falun Gong and other social movements considered insurrectionary by the regime are said to have been diagnosed with dysphrenia.

References
Chouinard G, Jones BD. Neuroleptic-induced supersensitivity psychosis: clinical and pharmacologic characteristics. Am J Psychiatry. 1980 Jan;137(1):16-21.
Fink M, Taylor MA. Catatonia. A History. In: Catatonia. A Clinician’s Guide to Diagnosis and Treatment. Cambridge University Press, Cambridge, 2003. 
Forrest DV, Fahn S. Tardive dysphrenia and subjective akathisia. J Clin Psychiatry. 1979 Apr;40(4):206. 
Frota LH. Partial Agonists in the Schizophrenia Armamentarium. Tardive Dysphrenia: The newest challenge to the last generation atypical antipsychotics drugs? J Bras Psiquiatr 2003; Vol 52 Supl 1;14-24.
Lehmann HE, Ban TA. The History of Psychopharmacology of Schizophrenia. Canadian Journal of Psychiatry 1997; 42:152-62.

Schizophrenia